The Board Tree Tunnel, near Littleton, West Virginia, was built between 1851 and 1858 by the Baltimore and Ohio Railroad on its main line between Baltimore, Maryland, and Wheeling, West Virginia, under the supervision of B&O chief engineer Benjamin Henry Latrobe, II. The   tunnel used a segmental cast iron lining system pioneered on the contemporaneous Kingwood Tunnel on the same line.

Workers were recruited from coal mines in the area to excavate the tunnel. The tunneling operations used black powder as explosive. About 30 deaths and 300 injuries occurred in the excavation of the Board Tree and Kingwood tunnels. The tunnel is now abandoned.

See also
List of tunnels documented by the Historic American Engineering Record in West Virginia

References

External links

Baltimore and Ohio Railroad tunnels
Buildings and structures in Marshall County, West Virginia
Historic American Engineering Record in West Virginia
Tunnels completed in 1858
Railroad tunnels in West Virginia